The Andrew Snable House is a historic house located on Sandyston-Haney's Mill Road near Wallpack Center in Walpack Township of Sussex County, New Jersey. It was added to the National Register of Historic Places on July 23, 1979, for its significance in architecture and exploration/settlement.

History and description
The house was probably built  by Andrew Snable. The property is along the Flat Brook, a tributary of the Delaware River. The land was once owned by Colonel John Rosenkrans, a prominent local militia leader during the American Revolution. Andrew Snable bought the land for the house from Rosenkrans' son Levi in 1801.

The house is a -story stone cabin measuring 36 feet by 20 feet. It is notable for being one of the best-preserved stone cottages in the area, which preceded the larger framed farmhouses that were built from the mid-1800s on.

See also
National Register of Historic Places listings in Sussex County, New Jersey

References

External links
 
  Colonel John Rosenkrans Boulder Monument

Walpack Township, New Jersey
Houses on the National Register of Historic Places in New Jersey
Houses completed in 1801
Houses in Sussex County, New Jersey
Stone houses in New Jersey
National Register of Historic Places in Sussex County, New Jersey
New Jersey Register of Historic Places